Nelligen is a village on the Clyde River on the South Coast of New South Wales, Australia.  It is located on the Kings Highway.

Location and services 

Local services include a general store, hotel, and general cemetery.

History 

The original inhabitants of the land were Aborigines of the Walbanga, Murrinjari and Bergalia clans. The origin of the name is unclear and was already in use at the time of the first survey in 1828.

The village of Nelligen was gazetted in 1854 and a road inland to Braidwood was completed two years later. No bridges existed across the Clyde at the time, so produce and minerals from southern New South Wales were delivered to Nelligen for transport by twice-weekly steamer to Sydney; the town was serviced by the Illawarra Steam Navigation Company. The post office opened in 1858 and a Protestant church was constructed in 1872. The existing Roman Catholic church dates from 1895.

By 1892 the population had grown to 500 but construction of several coastal bridges and the growth of Batemans Bay began to reduce local trading opportunities. By 1934 the population had fallen to 350, and by 2006 this had further declined to 228.

Between about 1860 and 1915 there were some gold workings in the Nelligen district.

A punt service across the Clyde River was begun at Nelligen in 1895 and continued until 1964 when the Nelligen bridge was completed.

Gallery

References

Towns in New South Wales
Towns in the South Coast (New South Wales)
Eurobodalla Shire